Seirocastnia is a genus of moths of the family Noctuidae. The genus was erected by Augustus Radcliffe Grote in 1866.

Species
 Seirocastnia albifascia Joicey & Talbot, 1922
 Seirocastnia amalthea Dalman, 1823
 Seirocastnia columbina Westwood, 1877
 Seirocastnia extensa Jordan, 1908
 Seirocastnia inca Hering, 1925
 Seirocastnia latimargo Hering, 1925
 Seirocastnia magnifica Hering, 1925
 Seirocastnia meridiana Schaus, 1896
 Seirocastnia nocturna Burmeister, 1879
 Seirocastnia panamensis Hampson, 1901
 Seirocastnia tribuna Hübner, [1831]
 Seirocastnia volupia Druce, 1897

References

Agaristinae